Forbidden is the third solo album by American singer-songwriter and YouTube celebrity Todrick Hall with music produced by Jeeve Ducornet and wiidope, released on March 28, 2018.

Composition
Featured artists include Jade Novah, RuPaul, Brandy, Cynthia Erivo, Keala Settle, Tamar Braxton, Jenifer Lewis, Tiffany Haddish, Sheryl Lee Ralph, Bob the Drag Queen, Shangela, Tre Melvin, Kway, Nick Rashad Burroughs, Scotch Ellis Loring, Doug Spearman, and Cristian Anthony Fagins.

It is a concept album and visual album that talks about a distant future in which black LGBT people rule the fictitious North-American city of Nacirema Falls, in the fictitious country Nacirema, promoting white racism and "straightphobia" as a critique to nowadays prejudice against the black and LGBT communities.

Music videos
Hall has released the musical in the form of an hour-and-a-half-long piece (as well as each song separately) on his YouTube channel. "2003" is the only song that is not included in the full video, however a bonus music video was released.

Promotion
On March 14, 2018, the music video for "Ordinary Day" was released on Todrick's YouTube channel as the first single from the album. The second single, "Dem Beats" was released on March 22 along with the pre-order for the album. Following the release of the album, every song was released as an individual video. In addition, Todrick has released 6 episodes of a behind the scenes series called "Making Forbidden: Todrick Hall", as well as instrumentals of "Type", "Play", "Forbidden", "Wanted", "Thug", "Forever", "Doll Hairs", "Boys Wear Pink", and "All American." 
Hall promoted the musical with a worldwide tour, titled Todrick Hall American: The Forbidden World Tour.

Track listing

Track listing adapted from AllMusic and the iTunes Store.

Charts

References

2018 albums
Todrick Hall albums
Electropop albums
Contemporary R&B albums by American artists
Hip hop soul albums
Concept albums
LGBT-related albums
Visual albums